Scopula subcarnea is a moth of the  family Geometridae. It is found in India (the Khasia Hills).

References

Moths described in 1934
Taxa named by Louis Beethoven Prout
subcarnea
Moths of Asia